Austin Kingsley Swift (born March 11, 1992) is an American actor who has starred in films such as Live by Night (2016) and I.T. (2016). The younger brother of singer-songwriter Taylor Swift, he has appeared in or produced several of her music videos and manages her film projects and music licensing.

Early life 
Austin Kingsley Swift was born on March 11, 1992, at Reading Hospital in West Reading, Pennsylvania. His father, Scott Swift, is a financial advisor at Merrill Lynch, and his mother, Andrea Gardner Swift ( Finlay), is a former homemaker who had previously worked as a mutual fund marketing executive. His older sister, Taylor Swift, is a singer-songwriter. His maternal grandmother, Marjorie Finlay, was an opera singer. Swift's paternal great-great-grandfather was an Italian immigrant entrepreneur and community leader who opened several businesses in Philadelphia in the 1800s. Swift moved from Wyomissing, Pennsylvania, to Hendersonville, Tennessee with his family at a young age.

Education and career 
Swift graduated from the University of Notre Dame in 2015, where he studied film and had roles in plays such as Dead Man's Cell Phone and Six Characters in Search of an Author. He transferred to Vanderbilt University but eventually transferred back to University of Notre Dame to complete his studies. He interned at Lionsgate, where his responsibilities included making and sending out screeners. He made his film debut in the 2016 thriller I.T. starring Pierce Brosnan. Swift has also appeared in Live by Night, Megyn Kelly's political drama Embeds, sitcom Still the King, and Todd Berger's Cover Versions. In 2019, he starred in the indie movie Braking for Whales, originally titled Whaling, written by Tammin Sursok and her husband Sean McEwen, and in the horror thriller We Summon the Darkness, directed by Marc Meyers.

Filmography

Film

Television

Music video

References

External links
 

1992 births
21st-century American male actors
Living people
American male film actors
American male television actors
American people of Italian descent
American people of Scottish descent
American people of German descent
Male actors from Nashville, Tennessee 
People from Wyomissing, Pennsylvania
University of Notre Dame alumni
Taylor Swift